The Martand Sun Temple is a eighth century (CE) Hindu temple attributed to Lalitaditya Muktapida of the Karkota dynasty. The temple is located near the city of Anantnag in the Kashmir Valley of Jammu and Kashmir (union territory), India. It was dedicated to Surya, the chief solar deity in Hinduism; Surya is also known by the Sanskrit-language synonym Martand. The temple was destroyed by Sikandar Shah Miri.

History

Establishment 
According to Kalhana, the Martand Sun Temple was commissioned by Lalitaditya Muktapida in the eighth century AD.

Destruction 
According to Jonaraja (fl. 1430) as well as Hasan Ali, the temple was destroyed by Sikandar Shah Miri (1389-1413) in a zeal to Islamise the society under the advice of Sufi preacher Mir Muhammad Hamadani; Jonaraja pinned the blame on his chief-counsel Suhabhatta, a Brahman neo-convert who was held to have manifested a reign of intense persecution for the local Hindus whereas Ali particularly affirmed Sikandar's own convictions in these aspects.

Jonaraja was appointed by Sikandar's son, who sought to bring back the Brahminical elite into the royal fold while later Muslim chroniclers had their motives to fit the past into an idealist tale of orthodox Islamic morality. According to Chitralekha Zutshi and Richard G. Salomon, Sikandar's policies were guided by realpolitik and, like with the previous Hindu rulers, an attempt to secure political legitimacy by asserting state power over Brahmans and gaining access to wealth controlled by Brahminical institutions. J. L. Bhan notes a stone sculpture—a four-armed Brahma, sculpted by son of a Buddhist Sanghapati and dedicated to Sikandar—to challenge simplistic notions of religious persecution. Slaje disagrees about an absence of religious motivations but notes the aversion of Brahmin chroniclers to be, largely, the result of resistance to the gradual disintegration of caste-hierarchy under Muslim influence.

Brajendranath De suggested that Jonaraja mentions much about breaking of images, but he couldn't find any mention of the demolition of temples. G M D Sufi tells that the character of the existing temples might have been changed by removal of idols and making a niche towards Ka'ba, after there was spread of Islam in the area. The temples might not have been brought down by the king. Dr Syed Gazanfar Farooq cites Chaturtha Rajatarangini by Suka, where the author mentions a severe earthquake bringing destruction to Kashmir in 1554, but the inhabitants of Vijayesvara, Martanda and Varahakshetra being not fearful due to sanctity of the three tirthas. This may mean that shrines in those places were visited by worshippers and their conditions intact during this time. Dr Farooq draws the conclusion that earthquakes, the nature of its friable building materials, the extreme weather which often brought frost and snow, and some defective constructions might have destroyed the temple.

Degradation 
The ruins and the remnants of structure were further ruined by several earthquakes.

Architecture 
The Martand temple was built on top of a plateau from where one can view whole of the Kashmir Valley. From the ruins and related archaeological findings, it can be said it was an excellent specimen of Kashmiri architecture, which had blended the Gandharan, Gupta and Chinese forms of architecture.

The temple has a colonnaded courtyard, with its primary shrine in its center and surrounded by 84 smaller shrines, stretching to be 220 feet long and 142 feet broad total and incorporating a smaller temple that was previously built. The temple turns out to be the largest example of a peristyle in Kashmir, and is complex due to its various chambers that are proportional in size and aligned with the overall perimeter of the temple. In accordance with Hindu temple architecture, the primary entrance to the temple is situated in the western side of the quadrangle and is the same width as the temple itself, creating grandeur. The entrance is highly reflective of the temple as a whole due to its elaborate decoration and allusion to the deities worshiped inside. The primary shrine is located in a centralised structure (the temple proper) that is thought to have had a pyramidal top - a common feature of the temples in Kashmir. Various wall carvings in the antechamber of the temple proper depict other gods, such as Vishnu, and river goddesses, such as Ganga and Yamuna, in addition to the sun-god Surya.

Lime mortar was used with huge blocks of grey limestones. As lime mortar was used on a wider scale in North India only after the rise of Delhi Sultans in 13th century, the use of the material in this grand temple suggests that Lalitaditya employed immigrant Byzantine architects.

Conservation 
The Archaeological Survey of India has declared the Martand Sun Temple as a site of national importance in Jammu and Kashmir. The temple appears in the list of centrally protected monuments as Kartanda (Sun Temple).

In popular culture
1970: The Hindi film Man Ki Aankhen starring Dharmendra and Waheeda Rahman has Martand Temple as background for the Rafi-Lata song Chala Bhi Aa Aaja Rasiya.
1975: The Hindi film Aandhi starring Sanjeev Kumar and Suchitra Sen has Martand Temple as background for the Kishore-Lata song "Tere Bina Zindagi Se Koi Shikwa Nahiin".
2014: The temple was selected as the background for the song "Bismil", in the Hindi film Haider, modelled on Hamlet in the backdrop of Kashmir conflict. Certain Kashmiri Pandits claimed that the site was depicted as a "den of evil"—hurting their sentiments in the process—and sought a ban.

Gallery

Notes

References

External links

 Indira Gandhi National Centre for the Arts - Martand Sun Temple Site Photos
 Martand Sun Temple in winter - Pics of Surya Sun Temple under snow
 Martand Sun Temple and around

a)A History of Kashmir by Pandit Prithvi Nath Kaul Bamzai, pp. 140

8th-century Hindu temples
Hindu temples in Jammu and Kashmir
Destroyed temples
Archaeological sites in Jammu and Kashmir
Surya temples
Anantnag district
Religious buildings and structures completed in 756